The 2016 European Mountain Bike Championships were held in Huskvarna, Sweden, between 5 and 8 May 2016.

Medal summary

Cross-country

Cross-country eliminator

See also
2016 UCI Mountain Bike & Trials World Championships
2016 UCI Mountain Bike World Cup

External links
Official site

References

2016 European MTB Championships
European MTB Championships
Mountain biking events
Euro
European Mountain Bike Championships
European Mountain Bike Championships